Patrick Rundhaug (born 1965) is a chemist and inventor known for creating the primary method for treating and destroying polychlorinated biphenyls (PCB).

Biography
Rundhaug's areas of research interest have been electrochemical dehalogenation of halogenated hydrocarbons such as PCBs, water desalination, blood chemistry, water and wastewater treatment, hazardous waste treatment, aerogel uses, and corrosion / anti-corrosion control techniques for which he obtained several U.S. patents.  Some of which he legally defended for patent infringement.

He invented and patented the primary method for treating and destroying PCBs currently used worldwide. This was also the focus of his Ph.D. studies at the University of Arizona in the late 1990s and 2000. He also invented and patented InstaRust the solution used to put an instant rust finish on any metal surface. He developed a copper paint that was 50% copper by weight that can be given an instant patina and is used worldwide on signs, roofs, ornamental iron, doors, rain gutters, garage doors and other trim and fencing.

References

1965 births
21st-century American chemists
Living people
University of Arizona alumni